Selander Bridge is a bridge in Dar es Salaam, Tanzania that connects the north west of Dar es Salaam's city centre to the south eastern Oyster Bay neighbourhood.

History
It was constructed in 1929 and is named after John Einar Selander , Tanganyika's first Director of Public Works.

The present bridge was donated by the government of Japan as a token of cooperation between the governments of Japan and Tanzania, 
by Japan International Cooperation Agency in 1980 and was its first road project in Tanzania. The current four-lane bridge was built in the same year. It lies along the Ali Hassan Mwinyi road.

Tanzanite Bridge
Construction of the new bridge over the Msimbazi delta near the Indian ocean  which costs 258.3 billion Tanzanian shillings, will connect roads linking Aga Khan Hospital and Coco beach. The project will help to reduce the road traffic congestion. As of September 2021, the project has been completed by 93 percent, and is set to be ready by December this year. The bridge completed in Jan 2022, and started its operation on February 1. It was constructed with the concessional loan from the Republic of Korea, EDCF.

References

Bridges in Tanzania
Japan International Cooperation Agency